The women's competition in 53 kg division was staged on September 19–20, 2007.

Schedule

Medalists

Records

Results

References
Results 

Women's 53
World